Darıpınarı is a village in Çamlıyayla district of Mersin Province, Turkey.It a situated in the Taurus Mountains  east of Çamlıyayla. The population of Darıpınarı is  780 as of 2012.

References

External links
For images

Villages in Çamlıyayla District